Artical may refer to:
"Artical", a song by Roots Manuva from his 2001 album Run Come Save Me
Artical, an occasional misspelling of "article"